David Lindesay-Bethune, 15th Earl of Lindsay (9 February 1926 – 1 October 1989), styled Viscount Garnock between 1943 and 1985, was a British soldier.

Lindsay was the son of William Tucker Lindesay-Bethune, 14th Earl of Lindsay and Marjory Cross, daughter of Arthur John Graham Cross. He was educated at Eton and Magdalene College, Cambridge. He served in the Scots Guards as a junior officer and left with the rank of Major in 1951.

He was appointed Honorary Colonel on 29 May 1957 of the Fife and Forfar Yeomanry/Scottish Horse. He held this post until 1962, when his tenure expired. He was however allowed to retain the honorary rank of Colonel.

His interest in steam railways led to his acquiring the locomotive The Great Marquess from British Railways following its withdrawal in 1962. He succeeded Sir Gerald Nabarro as chairman of the Severn Valley Railway in 1973.

Family
Lord Lindsay married the Honourable Mary-Clare Douglas-Scott-Montagu, daughter of John Douglas-Scott-Montagu, 2nd Baron Montagu of Beaulieu and Alice Pearl Crake, on 31 October 1953. They had one son, James, and one daughter, Caroline, but were divorced in 1968. He married as his second wife Penelope Crossley, daughter of Anthony Crossley and Clare Frances Fortescue Thomson, in 1969. He died in 1989 and was succeeded by his only son, James.

References

Sources
 Burke's Peerage, Baronetage & Knightage, 107th Edition, edited by Charles Mosley, Wilmington, Delaware, 2003, vol II, pp. 2342–45;

External links

1926 births
1989 deaths
People educated at Eton College
Alumni of Magdalene College, Cambridge
Earls of Lindsay
Fife and Forfar Yeomanry/Scottish Horse officers
Scots Guards officers
David